"The Breeze and I" is a popular song.

The original music (instrumental only) entitled Andalucía,  was written by the Cuban composer Ernesto Lecuona as part of his Suite Andalucía in 1928. Emilio de Torre added Spanish lyrics, and English lyrics were added in 1940 by Al Stillman.

The best-known version of the song is that by Jimmy Dorsey in 1940.  The Jimmy Dorsey recording, with a vocal by Bob Eberly, was released by Decca Records as catalogue number 3150. The record first reached the Billboard magazine charts on July 20, 1940, and lasted nine weeks on the chart, peaking at #2.

Other notable recordings
Xavier Cugat – a No. 13 hit in 1940 (vocal by Dinah Shore).
Vic Damone – reached No. 21 in the Billboard charts in 1954.
Caterina Valente (1955) – The recording for Polydor was released in England as catalogue number BM 6002 and reached a peak position of #5 (Guinness British hit singles & albums 19). The record first reached the Billboard magazine charts on March 30, 1955 and lasted 14 weeks on the chart, peaking at #13.
Bing Crosby included the song in his albums Bing Crosby's Treasury - The Songs I Love (1965) and Bingo Viejo (1977). It was also included in a medley with "Malaguena" in his 1961 album El Señor Bing.
The Shadows - 'B' side of the 1963 single Foot Tapper (also, track 5 side 1 of their album Somethin' Else!!)
Kenny Burrell with the Brother Jack McDuff Quartet included it on their 1963 album Crash!

Film appearance
Cuban Pete (1946)

References

External links 
A more extensive list of recordings

Spanish-language songs
Songs with music by Ernesto Lecuona
Songs with lyrics by Al Stillman
Bing Crosby songs
Caterina Valente songs
1940 songs
Jeanette MacDonald songs